Heraclia gruenbergi is a species of moth of the family Noctuidae. It is found in  Kenya, Uganda and Congo.

References

Agaristinae
Moths of Africa
Moths described in 1911